Peerless Park is a former, disincorporated town located at the junction of Interstate 44 and Route 141 in St. Louis County, Missouri, United States. It was incorporated in 1935 and by the 1980s, the majority of the town was businesses and its population did not exceed 50. At the request of its citizens, the town was disincorporated on May 1, 1998.

The former Peerless Park has since been annexed by the City of Valley Park.

Demographics

References

Former cities in Missouri
Unincorporated communities in St. Louis County, Missouri
Unincorporated communities in Missouri
Populated places disestablished in 1998